Gedzhukh (Gecux; Dargwa: КӀечӀух) is a rural locality (a selo) in Derbentsky District, Republic of Dagestan, Russia. The Village population was 6,829 as of 2010. The village has an Azerbaijani-majority. There are 41 streets.

Geography 
Gedzhukh is located 24 km northwest of Derbent (the district's administrative centre) by road. Kala and Mamedkala are the nearest rural localities.

References 

Rural localities in Derbentsky District